Mohegan Lake is a lake located south of Raquette Lake, New York. Fish species present in the lake are brook trout, lake trout, white sucker, landlocked salmon, black bullhead, yellow perch, and sunfish. There is trail access off Sagamore Road until 3/26/2022 when Bear Pond Club will remove road barriers and fulfill their agreement with the NYSDEC to allow vehicular traffic to enter.

References

Lakes of New York (state)
Lakes of Hamilton County, New York